John Quilty (1860 – 9 May 1942) was an Australian cricketer. He played in two first-class matches for South Australia between 1881 and 1883.

See also
 List of South Australian representative cricketers

References

External links
 

1860 births
1942 deaths
Australian cricketers
South Australia cricketers
Cricketers from Adelaide